Suyu may refer to:

Suyu (Inca Empire), region or province of the Inca Empire
Suyu District, in Suqian, Jiangsu, China
Suyu-dong, a dong, neighbourhood of Gangbuk-gu in Seoul, South Korea
Suyu Station, on the Seoul Subway Line 4, South Korea